Richard Michael Pyrah (born 1 November 1982) is an English first-class cricketer, who played all his career for Yorkshire County Cricket Club.

Educated at Ossett School, the  right-hand batsman and right-arm medium pacer was used mainly in one day and Twenty20 cricket.  He made his one-day debut in 2001, but had to wait until 2004 for his first-class bow.

Pyrah made his 100th appearance for Yorkshire in one day cricket in June 2013, against Middlesex at Headingley.

Rich has twin daughters, Mollie and Tilly. He also has a partner called Alexandra Jane Ahern which has a daughter called Lilly Ahern lee 

In September 2015, at the end of his benefit season, Pyrah retired from professional cricket in order to take up a full-time post on the club's coaching staff.

References

External links

1982 births
Living people
Yorkshire cricketers
Cricketers from Dewsbury
English cricketers of the 21st century
English cricketers
Yorkshire Cricket Board cricketers
English cricket coaches